Noel Broomes (born 23 December 1956) is a Barbadian cricketer. He played in eight first-class and six List A matches for the Barbados cricket team from 1982 to 1987.

See also
 List of Barbadian representative cricketers

References

External links
 

1956 births
Living people
Barbadian cricketers
Barbados cricketers
People from Saint James, Barbados